Opua is a locality in the Bay of Islands, in the sub-tropical Northland Region of New Zealand.  It is notable as the first port for overseas yachts arriving in the country after crossing the Pacific Ocean.  In the original 1870s plans for the town, it was named Newport. The town of Paihia is nearby, and the small settlement of Te Haumi is in between.

The car ferry across the Bay of Islands, the main tourist access to Russell, runs between Opua and Okiato.

The New Zealand Ministry for Culture and Heritage gives a translation of "place of the flower" for Ōpua.

The Waimangaro area north-west of Opua is listed on the Ngāpuhi and Te Puni Kōkiri websites as a traditional meeting point of the Ngāpuhi hapū of Te Uri Ongaonga.

Demographics

Opua had a population of 1,137 at the 2018 New Zealand census, an increase of 129 people (12.8%) since the 2013 census, and an increase of 30 people (2.7%) since the 2006 census. There were 495 households, comprising 558 males and 579 females, giving a sex ratio of 0.96 males per female. The median age was 56.2 years (compared with 37.4 years nationally), with 120 people (10.6%) aged under 15 years, 108 (9.5%) aged 15 to 29, 552 (48.5%) aged 30 to 64, and 354 (31.1%) aged 65 or older.

Ethnicities were 85.5% European/Pākehā, 17.4% Māori, 2.9% Pacific peoples, 3.7% Asian, and 2.4% other ethnicities. People may identify with more than one ethnicity.

The percentage of people born overseas was 31.1, compared with 27.1% nationally.

Although some people chose not to answer the census's question about religious affiliation, 56.5% had no religion, 32.7% were Christian, 0.5% had Māori religious beliefs, 0.3% were Hindu, 0.3% were Muslim, 0.8% were Buddhist and 1.8% had other religions.

Of those at least 15 years old, 213 (20.9%) people had a bachelor's or higher degree, and 126 (12.4%) people had no formal qualifications. The median income was $27,300, compared with $31,800 nationally. 126 people (12.4%) earned over $70,000 compared to 17.2% nationally. The employment status of those at least 15 was that 429 (42.2%) people were employed full-time, 159 (15.6%) were part-time, and 24 (2.4%) were unemployed.

Port of entry
Opua is New Zealand's northernmost port of entry for overseas vessels, and a Customs and Ministry for Primary Industries Place of First Arrival. It is a popular destination for cruising yachts owing to its sheltered, deep water anchorage, and numerous facilities for cruisers, including the 250-berth Opua Marina, Ashby's Boatyard and Opua Cruising Club.

Railway
The Opua Branch, a branch line railway sometimes considered part of the North Auckland Line, formerly served the town.  The first railway link, from Opua to Kawakawa, opened on 7 April 1884.  When the North Auckland Line was completed in 1925, a thrice weekly passenger express train called the Northland Express operated directly to Opua from Auckland.  In November 1956, this was replaced by a railcar service run by RM class 88 seaters, but this service terminated at the other northern terminus, Okaihau on the Okaihau Branch.  Opua passengers thus had to use mixed trains that carried freight as well as passengers; these trains ceased on 18 June 1976 when the line became freight-only.  As Opua's use as a commercial port declined, so did the freight traffic on the railway, and it was last used in 1985.

The line was then leased to the Bay of Islands Vintage Railway, who have operated tourist services between Opua and Kawakawa, with a break when the Land Transport Safety Authority withdrew the line's operating licence.  Part of the line in Opua is now on private land, and restoration by the vintage railway trust is proceeding.

Education
The local primary school, Opua School, is a coeducational full primary (years 1-8, with 5 classrooms) school with a roll of  students as of  The school was established in 1886.  It has an open and easy-going policy of enrolling the children of overseas families mooring in the Bay for weeks or months at a time – making it a highly international school for a small community.

Notable people
 Myra Larcombe (1927–2022), swimming coach and police officer
 Harold Rushworth (1880–1950), politician and farmer

References

External links

 Opua Marina
 Opua Cruising Club

Far North District
Populated places in the Northland Region
Bay of Islands